Jagannath Tarka Panchanan (23 September 1695 – 1806) was a legendary Sanskrit scholar and pundit of ancient Hindu Laws.

Biography

Tarka Panchanan was born in Tribeni in 1695. He was the son of Rudradeva Bhattacharji, a poor Brahmin of Tribeni, Hooghly district. He obtained great respect by the highest Hindu nobles and the Hindu community. Tarka Panchanan had a wonderful memory and became a remarkable logician and unrivaled in his knowledge of Hindu law. He was a great teacher and had immense knowledge on all branches of the Dharmasastras. Tarka panchanan assisted Sir William Jones in his endeavor to compile Vivadabhangarnava that literally means 'a break wave on the ocean of disputes' and reconcile the schools of Hindu jurisprudence. He assisted judges to familiarize with the Indian culture as a consequence of a parliamentary mandate to perform judicial duties. The text was first published in 1801 under the title – A Digest of Hindu Law, which tried to legitimize the transformation of the prescriptive guidelines enshrined in the Sastras into legal rules to be directly administered through court by using terminologies like Digest. Tarka Panchanan taught Sanskrit to Robert Clive. He supposedly introduced Durga Puja in Tribeni.

References

1695 births
1806 deaths
Bengali Hindus
Sanskrit writers
Indian Sanskrit scholars
17th-century Indian linguists
People from Hooghly district
Sanskrit scholars from Bengal